Zundert Trappist is a Trappist beer produced by De Kievit Trappist Brewery, part of the Trappist abbey Maria Toevlucht, from the town of Zundert in the Netherlands.

Since 2018 De Kievit Trappist Brewery produces another Trappist beer. This new beer is called Zundert 10 after the 10% alcohol it contains and the original Zundert has been renamed Zundert 8.

Zundert and La Trappe are the only two Trappist beers brewed in the Netherlands.

References

External links 
  Trappistenbrouwerij de Kievit, official website
 

Beer in the Netherlands
Culture of North Brabant
Trappist beer
Zundert